The Sukulu mine is a large niobium mine located in eastern Uganda in the Eastern Region. Sukulu represents one of the largest niobium reserves in Uganda having estimated reserves of 230 million tonnes of ore grading 0.2% niobium metal.

See also 
Mining industry of Uganda

References 

Niobium mines in Uganda